The Waco F series is a series of American-built general aviation and military biplane trainers of the 1930s from the Waco Aircraft Company.

Development

The Waco 'F' series of biplanes supplanted and then replaced the earlier 'O' series of 1927/33. The 'F' series had an airframe which was smaller and about  lighter than the 'O' series, while continuing to provide accommodation for three persons in tandem open cockpits. A similar performance to the earlier model was obtained on the power of smaller and more economical engines.

The initial models were the INF ( Kinner engine), KNF ( Kinner) and the RNF  ( Warner Scarab), all of which had externally braced tailwheel undercarriages. The most powerful in the range was the ZPF of 1936/37, intended for executive use.

Operational history

The 'F' series was popular with private owner pilots for sporting and other uses and continued in production through the late 1930s.  The tandem cockpit UPF-7 was adopted by the Civilian Pilot Training Program and continued in production until 1942 by which time over 600 had been built.

The 1934 model YMF was substantially redesigned with a longer and wider fuselage, larger rudder and other structural changes, and put into production in March 1986 by WACO Classic Aircraft of Lansing, Michigan as the YMF-5. Over 150 YMF-5s were completed as of 2017 with new examples being built to specific orders.

The WACO Aircraft Company of Ohio Inc had built three replicas by December 2011, which they designated MF.

Considerable numbers of 'F' series biplanes, both original and newly built, remain in service.

Variants
Listed in approximate chronological order (per Simpson, 2001, p. 573)
First letter of designation refers to engine installed.
From 1936 Waco added year suffixes to designations—e.g. YPF-6, YPF-7, with the numeral being the last digit of the model year.

INF  Kinner B-5, certified ATC# 345 on 2 August 1930.
KNF  Kinner K-5, certified ATC# 313 on 12 April 1930. 
RNF  Warner Scarab, certified ATC# 311 on 7 April 1930.

PCF  Jacobs LA-1 and new cross-braced undercarriage, PCF-2 certified ATC# 473 on 2 October 1931
PBF as PCF with 'B' wings
QCF  Continental A70, QCF-2 certified ATC# 416 on 9 April 1931
UBF  Continental R-670

UMF  Continental R-670A and longer and wider fuselage, and larger fin
YMF  Jacobs L-4

YPF-6 and YPF-7  Jacobs L-4
ZPF-6 and ZPF-7  Jacobs L-5
UPF-7 tandem trainer with wide-track undercarriage and  Continental R-670 (designated PT-14 by the USAAC)

Waco Classic Aircraft replicas
YMF-5 1986 design roughly based on the YMF, built by WACO Classic Aircraft 
YMF-5D 2009 improved YMF-5
 YMF-5F YMF-5 with Aerocet 3400 amphibious floats

Military designations
JW-1Two UBF designated XJW-1 were used by the US Navy as hook trainers for the skyhook airship parasite aircraft program.
PT-14USAAC/USAAF designation for UPF-7

Operators

Military operators

Guatemalan Air Force - At least 1 Waco YMF-7 received in 1934. Was still in airworthy condition in 1998.

United States Army Air Corps - Adopted the UPF-7 as the PT-14, with one XPT-14 and 13 YPT-14s being purchased, with an additional UPF-7 impressed in 1942 as a PT-14A.
United States Navy

Specifications (UPF-7)

References
 Notes

 Bibliography

External links
 

Aerobatic aircraft
1930s United States civil utility aircraft
F series